Sonnabend is a German word for Saturday, along with the more common Samstag.  Loosely translated, Sonnabend means the eve of Sunday.

Sonnabend may also refer to:

 Ileana Sonnabend, art dealer, was owner of the Sonnabend Gallery
 Joseph Sonnabend, physician and AIDS researcher
 Roger Sonnabend, American hotelier
 Yolanda Sonnabend (1935–2015), British theatre and ballet designer and painter